Federal Bullets is a 1937 American crime film written and directed by Karl Brown. It is based on the 1937 novel Federal Bullets by George Fielding Eliot. The film stars Milburn Stone, Zeffie Tilbury, Terry Walker, William Harrigan, Helen MacKellar and Selmer Jackson. The film was released on October 30, 1937, by Monogram Pictures.

Plot

Cast          
Milburn Stone as Tommy Thompson
Zeffie Tilbury as Mrs. Crippen
Terry Walker as Milly
William Harrigan as Chief
Helen MacKellar as Mrs. Thompson
Selmer Jackson as Harker
Matty Fain as 'Barber' John
Lyle Moraine as Pete
Warner Richmond as Burke
Betty Compson as Sue
Eddie Phillips as Durkin
John Merton as Manny Goe
Walter Long as Henchman

References

External links
 

1937 films
American crime films
1937 crime films
Monogram Pictures films
Films directed by Karl Brown
American black-and-white films
1930s English-language films
1930s American films